The 2007 Anaheim Classic was played between November 22 and November 25, 2007 at the Anaheim Convention Center in Anaheim, California.  The champion of the tournament was USC, who defeated Southern Illinois in the Championship Game.  The MVP of the tournament was O. J. Mayo of USC.

Bracket 
* – Denotes overtime period

All Tournament Team
 O. J. Mayo, USC - Tournament MVP
 Randal Falker, Southern Illinois
 Michael Bramos, Miami (Ohio)
 Tim Pollitz, Miami (Ohio)
 Jamont Gordon, Mississippi State

Anaheim
College basketball tournaments in California
Basketball competitions in Anaheim, California